KLCC may refer to:

Kuala Lumpur City Centre or KLCC, a development precinct in Kuala Lumpur
 KLCC Park
Suria KLCC, the shopping mall at the base of the Petronas Twin Towers
Kuala Lumpur Convention Centre
Aquaria KLCC, a public aquarium
Lot C, KLCC, a proposed office tower and retail space extension to Suria KLCC
Lot D1, KLCC, an undeveloped land, which currently serves as a car park lot, in front of Mandarin Oriental hotel
KLCC LRT station, an underground light rapid transit station serving the KLCC area
Persiaran KLCC MRT station, an underground under-construction station serving the KLCC area
KLCC (FM), a radio station (89.7 FM) licensed to Eugene, Oregon, United States